Sviđa mi se da ti ne bude prijatno (I like when you feel uncomfortable) is the debut album by the Serbian alternative rock band Disciplina Kičme, released by the Slovenian record label Helidon in 1983. A remastered version of the album was rereleased on CD on the compilation album Ove ruke nisu male... 1 in 2000.

Track listing

Personnel

The band 
 Koja (Dušan Kojić) — artwork by [cover], bass, vocals, lyrics by
 Žika (Srđan Todorović) — drums

Additional personnel 
 Dragan Topolac — handclaps
 Ljubomir Đukić — handclaps
 G. Matić — photography
 Goran B. — photography
 Igor Petrović — photography
 S. Jakšić — photography
 Riki Rif (Nebojša Antonijević "Anton") — producer, handclaps
 Toni Jurij - producer, recorded by

References 
 EX YU ROCK enciklopedija 1960-2006, Janjatović Petar; 
 Sviđa mi se da ti ne bude prijatno at Discogs

1983 debut albums
Serbian-language albums
Disciplina Kičme albums
Albums recorded in Slovenia